Mastax congoensis is a species of beetle in the family Carabidae with restricted distribution in the Afghanistan.

References

Mastax klapperichi
Beetles described in 1956
Beetles of Asia